Andover Down is a hamlet in Hampshire, England  east of Andover.

History 
On the 1888 OS map there are a very small number of houses: Down House, Down House farm, Harewood, Harewood Farm, and two further dwellings.

It seems Andover Down underwent some expansion immediately after the Second World War, but remained a relatively isolated location until the rapid expansion of Andover (as an overspill town) and in particular with the building of the Walworth Industrial Estate to the east.

With the large housing development at Picket Twenty, and especially the post-2018 second phase development, houses now surround the south of Andover Down, and it is arguably now a suburb of Andover.

In 2020 planning permission was sought to build additional housing to the north of Andover Down, on agricultural land

References

External links

Hamlets in Hampshire